1964 Famagusta incident was an ethnic clash  which occurred in Famagusta, Cyprus during May 1964 between Greek Cypriot Militia and Turkish Cypriots.

Incidents

11 May 
On May 11, 1964, in Famagusta, 2 Greek Cypriot officers and a policeman were killed by Turkish Cypriot separatists. One of the victims were Kostakis Pandelidis, son of Nicosia Police Chief.

12 May 
Following the murder, Greek Cypriot security forces who were ordered to "Kill 10 Turks for each slain Greek" entered the town to investigate the murder. 17 Turks that aren't related to murder were abducted the same day and executed by a firing squad in Famagusta.

13 May 
A massacre of Turks in British bases of Akrotiri and Dhekelia occurred 2 days after the murder. 11 Turks working in the area were killed. Their remains were found in 2006. Perperators of the massacres were Greek Cypriot police and colleagues of victims.

References 

Famagusta
Famagusta
Cyprus dispute